(former name; Nelson Yoshimura, ネルソン 吉村) was a Japanese football player and manager. He played for Japan national team, having naturalized in 1970.

Club career
Yoshimura was born in São Paulo, Brazil on August 16, 1947. He  moved to Japan and joined Yanmar Diesel in 1967. He played with Kunishige Kamamoto and so on and leads the team to the greatest era in Yanmar Diesel history. The club won Japan Soccer League champions 4 times and Emperor's Cup 3 times. He retired in 1980. He played 189 games and scored 30 goals in the league. He was selected Best Eleven 4 times.

National team career
On August 2, 1970, Yoshimura debuted for Japan national team against South Korea. He was selected Japan for 1974 Asian Games. He also played at 1972 Summer Olympics qualification, 1974 World Cup qualification and 1976 Summer Olympics qualification. He played 46 games and scored 7 goals for Japan until 1976.

Coaching career
After retirement, Yoshimura became a coach for Yanmar Diesel in 1981. In 1990, he was promoted to a manager. He managed until 1993.

On November 1, 2003, Yoshimura died of intracranial hemorrhage in Amagasaki at the age of 56. In 2010, he was selected to the Japan Football Hall of Fame.

Club statistics

National team statistics

Awards
 Japan Soccer League Best Eleven: (4) 1970, 1971, 1972, 1975
 Japan Soccer League Silver Ball (Assist Leader): 1972

References

External links
 
 Japan National Football Team Database
Japan Football Hall of Fame at Japan Football Association

1947 births
2003 deaths
Japanese footballers
Japan international footballers
Japan Soccer League players
Cerezo Osaka players
Footballers at the 1974 Asian Games
Brazilian emigrants to Japan
Brazilian people of Japanese descent
Naturalized citizens of Japan
Association football midfielders
Asian Games competitors for Japan
Deaths from intracranial haemorrhage